The 2012 Arkansas Democratic presidential primary was held on May 22. Incumbent Barack Obama won the primary against Tennessee attorney and perennial candidate John Wolfe Jr, who unexpectedly captured nearly 42% of the vote. All 47 delegates were allocated to, and pledged to vote for Barack Obama at the 2012 Democratic National Convention. While John Wolfe Jr. qualified for 19 delegates to the convention by virtue of his performances in Arkansas, State party officials said Wolfe missed two paperwork filing deadlines related to the delegate process, therefore he was not eligible for any delegates.  Wolfe commenced legal proceedings to have delegates in his name seated.  Eight other unpledged delegates, known as superdelegates, also attended the convention and cast their votes as well.

Results

Results by county

References

Arkansas
2012 Arkansas elections
2012